Sobor of 1503, also known as the "Sobor of widowed priests" was a sobor of the Russian Orthodox Church, which was held in Moscow in August and September 1503. The task of the sobor was the decision of a number of disciplinary matters in respect of which was issued two rulings. However, the more he remembered as the cathedral, which was a question about the monastery's tenure. However, no conciliar decree to this effect is unknown. The sobor was convened with the initiative of Simon, Metropolitan of Moscow.

Attendants 
The Sobor was attended by Grand Prince Ivan III, his sons Vasily, Dmitry of Uglich, as well as the Reverend Neil Sora and St Joseph of Volokolamsk, the abbot of the Trinity-Sergius Monastery Serapion, abbots of monasteries and archimandrite, other spiritual and secular people.

The first stage of the cathedral: the question of representation duties 

Cathedral in 1503, in contrast to Vladimir's Sobor of 1274 limited the size of representation duties, levied when issuing letters of representation. The Sobor (Council) of 1503 condemned the charging of fees for the ordination of priests as simony, though the practice had been approved by the Moscow Council of 1270 and had been practiced in the Byzantine church for years before that. As a result of the condemnation, Archbishop Gennady of Novgorod was condemned the following year for simony and removed from office. Violate this rule, threatened the overthrow of dignity and consecration, perfect for a bribe, to annul. The decision applied to all degrees of priesthood. Conciliar definition of "resorting to levying About bribes from clergy for ordination" was signed. Subsequently Stoglavy Cathedral restoring representation charging fees, reversed this decision. The Sbobor also confirmed the lower limit for the dedication of thirty years as a priest, deacon – 25 years, Subdeacon – 20.

Question of widowed priests 
Another group of questions concerned morality priests. Obvious breach that is not without reason pointed Judaic heretics demanded action. First of all, it concerned widowed priests. It is known that the apostolic rules based directly on the Gospel, the priest can be married only once, "the husband of one wife ". Widowed priests, unafraid to break the church statutes, often entered into a second marriage.

Recalling metropolitans Saints Peter and Photios, mentioning the apostolic rule, however, without naming them, Cathedral widowed priests decided not to serve, the same as those entered into a second marriage, be defrocked priests and all rights. Others may serve in the choir, one-fourth of what the employee gets in their place the priest may receive Communion at the altar, wearing a stole.

Another decree concerned the so-called "double" monasteries in which monks lived together both sexes. Cathedral insisted on the necessity of their settlement . In the women's monasteries also should serve the secular clergy. Another decree forbade serve Liturgy drunk and hungover.

Not all met positively ban serve widowed priests. Unobjectionable indiscriminately with which the Cathedral approached this issue .

The initiator of this decision believe St. Joseph, whose writing has been included in the text "Stoglavy" (Chapter 79). In this brief paper Joseph objected to those who refer to the apostolic decree contradicts the rules.

References 

Russian Orthodox Church in Russia
Ecumenical councils
History of the Russian Orthodox Church
16th-century Eastern Orthodoxy
1503 in Christianity
16th century in Russia
1503 in Europe
Eastern Orthodox Church councils
16th-century church councils